Johann Jakob Sotriffer (30 January 1796, St. Ulrich in Gröden - 28 April 1856, St. Ulrich in Gröden) was an Austrian sculptor and drawing teacher in South Tyrol.

Biography 
In 1821, Emperor Francis II approved the establishment of a drawing school in St. Ulrich. Sotriffer, who had learned various types of carving from his father, was selected from four applicants and sent to Vienna for training. In thanks, he presented the Emperor with two alabaster religious figures he had made, and was given 300 florins.

He attended classes at the Academy of Fine Arts as well as receiving practical instruction in the workshops of sculptors, turners, gilders and varnishers. In 1824, he was awarded the Academy's Gundel-Prize for excellence. Later that year, he finished his training and the drawing school was opened with great fanfare in January, 1825.

Although he was trained as a sculptor, he was not allowed to teach modelling in wax until 1832. His Pietà, carved in alabaster, may be seen at the Museum Gherdëina. He also carved the doors on the main portal at the Parish Church of St. Ulrich and angels for the church in Brixen. 

In addition to his work at the school, he served as the Armenfondverwalter (Poor Fund Administrator) for the municipality.

Upon retiring, he was succeeded by his son, Christian (1835–1908), then  and, finally, Vinzenz Runggaldier-Janon (1839–1892). The school closed in 1890.

Sources

External links 

1796 births
1856 deaths
Austrian sculptors
Austrian woodcarvers
Academy of Fine Arts Vienna alumni
People from Urtijëi